Nomad is a 1982 Hong Kong film directed by Patrick Tam. It is about the experiences of a group of youngsters who feel lost and try to find the true meaning of life. Nomad is considered one of the representatives of the Hong Kong New Wave films.

Plot
Louis (Leslie Cheung) is a young man from a rich family and misses his dead mother. He has a good friendship with his cousin Kathy (Pat Ha). Louis and Kathy later meet Tomato (Cecilia Yip), who becomes Louis' girlfriend, and Pong (Kent Tong), who becomes Kathy's boyfriend. The four live a casual life together, hang out aimlessly, and share their dreams and difficulties with one another on frequent trips to Hong Kong's outlying islands. But Kathy's past returns to haunt her. She once lived in Japan, and had a romantic relationship with Shinsuke Takeda (Yung Sai-kit), a Japanese man who is a member of the Japanese Red Army. Shinsuke Takeda is tired of his work in the Japanese Red Army and wants to quit the organization. This leads to a vow of revenge by the organization and Shinsuke Takeda runs to Kathy to ask for help. However, he was eventually found by the killers dispatched by the Red Army and both Kathy and Shinsuke are killed, while Louis and Tomato, who is pregnant with Louis' child, survive the ordeal.

Cast
 Leslie Cheung as Louis
 Pat Ha as Kathy
 Kent Tong as Pong
 Cecilia Yip as Tomato
 Yip Ha-lei as Pong's dad
 Yung Sai-Kit as Shinsuke Takeda

Nominations
Best Film – Hong Kong Film Awards (1983)
Best Director (Patrick Tam) – Hong Kong Film Awards (1983)
Best Actor (Leslie Cheung) – Hong Kong Film Awards (1983)
Best Art Direction (Willam Chang) – Hong Kong Film Awards (1983) 
Best New Performer – female (Cecilia Yip) – Hong Kong Film Awards (1983)
Best New Performer – female (Pat Ha) – Hong Kong Film Awards (1983)
Best Original Film Score (Man Yee Lam) – Hong Kong Film Awards (1983)
Best Cinematography (Wong Chung-Biu) – Hong Kong Film Awards (1983)

External links
 
 HK Cinemagic entry

Hong Kong thriller films
1982 films
1980s Cantonese-language films
Films directed by Patrick Tam (film director)
1980s Hong Kong films